Donald or Don Fleming may refer to:
Don Fleming (American football), (1937–1963), American football player
Don Fleming (musician) (born 1957), American musician and producer
Donald Fleming (1905–1987), Canadian politician
Donald S. Fleming (1913–2001), politician from Alberta, Canada